Janet McDonald (August 10, 1953 – April 11, 2007) was an American writer of young adult novels as well as the author of Project Girl, a memoir about her early life in Brooklyn's Farragut Houses and struggle to achieve an Ivy League education. Her best known children's book is Spellbound, which tells the story of a teenaged mother who wins a spelling competition and a college scholarship. The book was named as one of the American Library Association's eighty-four Best Book for Young Adults in 2002.

In addition to books, McDonald also wrote articles for publications such as Slate, including one in which she paid psychic Sylvia Browne $700 for a telephone reading. McDonald was a member of Mensa, the high IQ society.

Biography
After graduating from Vassar (1977), Columbia University Graduate School of Journalism (1984), and New York University Law School (1986), McDonald practiced law in New York City (1986–89) and Seattle (1989–91).  She took a position as an intern at a Paris law firm (1991–93) before moving to Olympia, Washington, to work in the Attorney General's office and teach French language classes at Evergreen State College. McDonald settled in Paris in 1995 to work first as an international attorney and then as a writer, until she died of cancer in 2007.

Bibliography

Books

Articles

Quotes

 "Freedom is ... not about nothing left to lose, it's about nothing left to be; you don't have to be anything."
 "Paris is where I became possible. It's where I became free."

References

Further reading
 Catherine Ross-Stroud. "Urban Hip-Hop Fiction: Janet McDonald", Tarshia Stanley (ed.), Encyclopedia of Hip-Hop Literature, Greenwood Press, 2008.

External links
 Slate. Various articles by McDonald, 1998–2003
 "Americans in Paris", This American Life, 2000 (extended radio interview with McDonald, beginning at 41.05)
 "Remembering Janet McDonald", Entrée to Black Paris, 2011
 Thomas E. Kennedy, "The Wind Blew It Away", The Literary Explorer, 2001
 Catherine Ross-Stroud, "A Talk with Janet McDonald", The ALAN Review, Fall 2009
 Jennifer Williams, "Twists and Turns", HipMama, 2003
 C-Span Book Discussion Janet McDonald discusses Project Girl, 1999
 Susie Linfield, "Caught in Life's Harsh Extremes", L.A. Times Book Review, 1999
 Julia Browne, "Janet's Own Rhythm", Spirit of Black Paris, 2007
 Reading Eagle "From Projects to Paris" Associated Press, 1999
 The Birmingham Post (England) "Letter from Paris", 1999
 Memorial Page by Janet McDonald's Family, Forever Missed.
 Sheryl McCarthy, "Talking With Janet McDonald / I Will Survive", Newsday, 2000
 Lisa J. Curtis "Tales From the Hood", Go Brooklyn, 2004
 Thomas E. Kennedy, "You Don’t Remember Me, But I Remember You - For Janet McDonald", Serving House Journal, 2011

1953 births
2007 deaths
American children's writers
20th-century American memoirists
American women novelists
20th-century American novelists
21st-century American novelists
American expatriates in France
Mensans
Vassar College alumni
American women memoirists
American women children's writers
20th-century American women writers
21st-century American women writers
Columbia University Graduate School of Journalism alumni
New York University School of Law alumni
21st-century American non-fiction writers
African-American novelists
Writers from Brooklyn
20th-century African-American women writers
20th-century African-American writers
21st-century African-American women
21st-century African-American people